Mainstay was a Christian rock band from Minneapolis, Minnesota. The band was formed in 2003 and is signed to BEC Recordings. While a lot of the band's music has decidedly Christian lyrics and messages, their music appeals to a large secular fanbase as well. Their music style has been compared to Copeland, Kutless, Sanctus Real, Lifehouse and The Goo Goo Dolls. Their debut album, Well Meaning Fiction, was released on February 21, 2006.

Discography
2004: From Here To Where....
2005: Mainstay EP
2006: Well Meaning Fiction
2007: Become Who You Are

Singles
 "Believe," hit at least No. 5 on the R&R magazine's February 16, 2008 Christian CHR chart. It was the 20th most-played song of 2008 on U.S. Contemporary Christian music radio stations according to R&R magazine's Christian CHR chart. The song was written  with Jeremy Camp.
 "Where Your Heart Belongs," No. 29 on the R&R Christian AC chart.
 "Become Who You Are," released to Christian CHR and Rock; as of October 10 it has not charted.

Members
Justin Anderson -  Vocals, Rhythm Guitar 
Scott Campbell - Lead Guitar 
Dan Ostebo - Bass Guitar
Ryan DeYounge - Drums

References

External links
 Official Site

Christian rock groups from Minnesota
Musical groups established in 2001